The Milwaukee County War Memorial is a memorial building located on Lake Michigan in Milwaukee, WI. It was designed by architect Eero Saarinen. Construction began in 1955 and the building was dedicated on Veterans Day in 1957.

The mosaic mural by Edmund D. Lewandowski was installed in 1959. The mosaic uses more than one million pieces of glass and marble. The slightly abstracted Roman numerals, in shades of purple, blue, and rich black, are the beginning and ending dates of the U.S. involvement in the Second World War and the Korean War. MCMXLI (1941) through MCMXLV (1945) refers to World War II, and MCML (1950) through MCMLIII (1953) refers to the Korean War.

References

External links 
Official Website

Buildings and structures completed in 1957
Buildings and structures in Milwaukee
Eero Saarinen structures
Museums in Milwaukee
Military and war museums in Wisconsin
Monuments and memorials in Wisconsin
Military monuments and memorials in the United States